Annette Mbaye d’Erneville (born 23 June 1926) is a Senegalese writer. She is the mother of filmmaker Ousmane William Mbaye, and was the subject of his 2008 documentary film, Mère-Bi.

Career
Born in 1926 in Sokone, Senegal, and educated locally, she began her working life as a teacher. In 1947 she went to France to study journalism, and since 1963 was active in Radio Senegal, rising to become Director of Programmes. She has also been a journalist specializing in women's issues and in 1963 launched Awa magazine, the first francophone publication for African women. She specialises in writing children's literature and poetry and is associated with the Musée de la Femme Henriette-Bathily in Gorée.

Works
1965: Poèmes africains
1966: Kaddu (réédition des poèmes)
1976: Chansons pour Laïty
1983: Le Noël du vieux chasseur
1983: La Bague de cuivre et d'argent (prix Jeune Afrique in 1961)
2003: Motte de terre et motte de beurre
2003: Picc l'Oiseau et Lëpp-Lëpp le papillon

Bibliography
 Aliane, "Mme Mbaye d'Erneville, directrice des programmes à l'Office de radiodiffusion du Sénégal", Amina, n° 32, July 1975, pp. 21–23.
 Pierrette Herzberger-Fofana, "Annette Mbaye d'Erneville (Sénégal)", in Littérature féminine francophone d'Afrique noire, Paris, L'Harmattan, 2000, pp. 374–81.
 Annette Mbaye d'Erneville (Sénégal), Audrey, future princesse d'Erneville.

References

External links
 Biographie
 « D'Orphée à Prométhée : la poésie africaine au féminin. En hommage aux pionnières de l'écriture féminine africaine, 1967-1997 » (article d'Angèle Bassolé Ouédraogo, 1998)
 "Annette Mbaye D'Erneville" at Ashoka

1926 births
Living people
Senegalese poets
Senegalese women writers
People from Fatick Region
Senegalese women poets
20th-century poets
20th-century women writers
21st-century poets
21st-century women writers